Evan Lee (born June 18, 1997) is an American professional baseball pitcher in the Washington Nationals organization. He made his MLB debut in 2022.

Career
Lee was a two-way player at the University of Arkansas, playing in the outfield and pitching. He was a draft-eligible sophomore when he was selected by the Nationals in the 15th round of the 2018 Major League Baseball draft as a left-handed pitcher. Lee chose to sign with the Nationals, turning pro. Lee was selected to participate in the Arizona Fall League in 2021, pitching in relief for the Surprise Saguaros. The Nationals added him to their 40-man roster after the season. He made his major league debut as a spot starter against the New York Mets on June 1, 2022. He was sent outright off the 40-man roster on November 15, 2022.

On the mound, Lee uses a four-pitch mix, although he described himself in a 2020 interview as "fastball-heavy". He also throws a 12–6 curveball, a cutter, and a slider.

Personal life
Lee is married to former University of Arkansas softball player Sydney Parr. The two met in college when they were both student athletes at the University of Arkansas.

References

External links

1997 births
Living people
People from Bryant, Arkansas
Baseball players from Arkansas
Major League Baseball pitchers
Washington Nationals players
Arkansas Razorbacks baseball players
Gulf Coast Nationals players
Surprise Saguaros players
Auburn Doubledays players
Wilmington Blue Rocks players
Harrisburg Senators players